This is a list of international presidential trips made by Shavkat Mirziyoyev, the 2nd President of Uzbekistan.

2017

2018

2019

2020

2021

2022

2023

Future visits

Number of visits 

Updated December 1, 2022.

Visits hosted in Uzbekistan by Shavkat Mirziyoyev 
Since September 2016, all the visits to Uzbekistan have had the character of working visits. Mostly it was giving honor to the First President Islam Karimov at his burial site. On 16 September 2017, Kazakh President Nursultan Nazarbayev visited Uzbekistan with state visit. That was the first state visit hosted by Mirziyoyev in Tashkent.

State visits

Working visits

Public and regional visits

Future visits

References 

Lists of diplomatic trips
Lists of diplomatic visits by heads of state
Mirziyoyev
Shavkat Mirziyoev